Christopher Robert Burke (born 2 December 1983) is a Scottish professional football coach and former player, who is currently a reserve team coach at Kilmarnock. He primarily played as a right-winger, but also played on the left wing.

Burke began his career with Scottish Premier League club Rangers, playing in 131 games, but without establishing himself as a regular first team player. He then played 118 matches over two-and-a-half seasons at Championship club Cardiff City, followed by 155 matches over three seasons at the same level for Birmingham City. He then made 50 league appearances over two seasons for Nottingham Forest. He left Forest after a brief loan spell with Rotherham United. Burke returned to Scottish football in September 2016, signing for Ross County. After one season there he signed for Kilmarnock, where he made nearly 150 league appearances across five seasons. 

Burke was capped by Scotland seven times at full international level, and scored two goals on his Scotland debut, a Kirin Cup match against Bulgaria in 2006. In addition to this, he has also appeared once for the Scotland B team, and twice for the Scotland under-21 team.

Club career

Rangers
Born in Glasgow and brought up in the city's Gorbals district, Burke is a product of Rangers' youth system having joined on 5 July 2000, but he had previously played for Celtic Boys Club. He first broke into the Rangers first team in the 2001–02 season and scored on his début against Kilmarnock on 20 March 2002. He became a regular player in the Rangers squad and was involved in the club's 2003–04 Champions League campaign. In the opening game of the 2004–05 season at Aberdeen, Burke fainted on the pitch and was out of action for almost the whole season with a mysterious virus.

However, he came back strongly and played in most Rangers games in 2005–06, including vital Champions League games against Internazionale, Porto and Villarreal. He was voted as both Supporters' and Players' Player of the Year, while also picking up an accolade from John Greig. Burke was injured against Celtic on 23 September 2006, damaging ligaments in his left shoulder in a challenge with Aiden McGeady. The injury required an operation and Burke was ruled out of action for an estimated three months.

On 25 January 2007, Burke signed a new contract with Rangers keeping him at the club until 2009. After being frozen out of the first team squad for the first half of the 2007–08 season, Burke returned to replace the injured Nacho Novo and DaMarcus Beasley, keeping his place in the side until April 2008, when he himself was injured in a Scottish Cup match against St Johnstone.

Cardiff City

After making just two appearances for Rangers during the first half of the 2008–09 season, Burke left the club on 9 January to sign for Football League Championship side Cardiff City on a free transfer, linking up with former Rangers teammates Gavin Rae and Ross McCormack. He made his debut on 17 January when he replaced Peter Whittingham after 45 minutes of a 1–1 draw with Birmingham City, and scored his first goal for the club on 21 April during a 2–2 draw with Charlton Athletic.

Burke scored his first goal of the 2009–10 season on 16 September, in a 1–0 win over Reading at the Madejski Stadium. His second, two weeks later, came in a 6–1 thrashing of Derby County at the Cardiff City Stadium. In December, he scored in three consecutive matches, including winning goals against Preston North End and Middlesbrough, and on 27 March 2010, Burke reached ten goals in all competitions with a goal against Crystal Palace, leading manager Dave Jones to describe him as being "an integral part of what we do". On 23 May 2011, Burke left Cardiff City after failing to agree a new contract.

Birmingham City

On 8 June 2011, Burke signed a pre-contract agreement with fellow Championship club Birmingham City. He joined the club formally on a two-year deal on 1 July, having left Cardiff on a free transfer under the Bosman ruling. He made his Birmingham debut on the opening day of the season in a 2–1 defeat to Derby County, and came close to equalising in the second half when his shot after a fine solo run beat the goalkeeper but rebounded back into play off the post. Burke was part of the starting eleven in Birmingham's first match in major European competition for nearly 50 years, the Europa League play-off round first leg against Portuguese club Nacional, which finished goalless. He featured in 61 of the club's 62 competitive games as they reached the play-offs, scoring 14 goals and making 19 assists, and won the club's Player of the Year award, as well as the Players' and Junior Blues' Player of the Year awards.

At the end of the 2012–13 season, the club took up their option to extend Burke's contract for a further year. He left the club when that contract expired.

Nottingham Forest
Burke signed a two-year deal with Championship club Nottingham Forest on 29 July 2014. He scored on his debut, curling the second goal in from the edge of the box in the 30th minute of a 2–0 win over Blackpool in Forest's first game of the season, and started Forest's first eight league games of the new season. His second goal, in new manager Dougie Freedman's first home match in charge, was Forest's second in a 3–0 win over Wigan Athletic in February 2015, and he also scored in his next two appearances, against Lancashire clubs Blackpool and Bolton Wanderers.

Rotherham United loan
Burke joined fellow Championship club Rotherham United on 22 January 2016 on loan until the end of the season. He made his debut the following day against Cardiff City, and scored his first goal for the club a week later in a 4–1 defeat against Charlton Athletic.

On his return to Nottingham Forest, Burke was released at the end of his contract.

Ross County
In September 2016, Burke signed a contract to the end of the 2016–17 season with Scottish Premiership club Ross County. His time there was again hampered by the effects of a virus.

Kilmarnock
Burke signed a one-year contract with Kilmarnock in July 2017. On 25 October he scored a stoppage-time goal to earn his side a point in a league match away to former club Rangers. He signed a further one-year contract with Kilmarnock on 22 June 2018. His second goal for the club came eleven months after his first: a "brilliant long-range howitzer" to level the scores in a home league fixture against Celtic on 23 September 2018, which Kilmarnock won 2–1. He scored against Rangers again on the final day of the 2018–19 Scottish Premiership season, as Killie secured third place, their highest position in over 50 years.

Burke left Kilmarnock after the 2021–22 season, in which the club won promotion back to the Scottish Premiership, but then returned as a reserve team coach.

International career
Burke won his first Scotland cap on 11 May 2006 as a substitute against Bulgaria in the Kirin Cup and scored twice in a 5–1 victory.

After six years without international recognition, Burke was named in Gordon Strachan's first squad in January 2013. According to Strachan, "Chris was fantastic in the Europa League at a good level, he has a maturity about his play now. In the international set-up you need to be able to beat people by passing or eliminating people by going past them. He can certainly do the second part and is getting better at the first. International defences are so good, you need people like that."

Career statistics

Club

International appearances

International goals
Scores and results list Scotland's goal tally first.

Honours
Rangers
 Scottish Premier League: 2004–05
 Scottish League Cup: 2007–08

Scotland
 Kirin Cup: 2006

Kilmarnock 

Scottish championship 2021-22

References

External links
 
 

1983 births
Living people
People from Gorbals
Footballers from Glasgow
Scottish footballers
Scotland B international footballers
Scotland under-21 international footballers
Scotland international footballers
Association football wingers
Rangers F.C. players
Cardiff City F.C. players
Birmingham City F.C. players
Nottingham Forest F.C. players
Rotherham United F.C. players
Ross County F.C. players
Kilmarnock F.C. players
Scottish Premier League players
English Football League players
Scottish Professional Football League players
Kilmarnock F.C. non-playing staff